Cambroraster is an extinct monotypic genus of hurdiid radiodont, dating to the middle Cambrian, and represented by the single formally described species Cambroraster falcatus. Hundreds of specimens were found in the Burgess Shale, and described in 2019. A large animal (for its era) at up to 30cm long (but not as long as Titanokorys at 50 cm), it is characterized by a significantly enlarged horseshoe-shaped dorsal carapace (H-element), and presumably fed by sifting through the sediment with its well-developed tooth plates (oral cone) and short frontal appendages with hooked spines. It is named partially after the fictional Millennium Falcon, which its dorsal carapace resembles.

A second species of Cambroraster is known from the Chengjiang Biota of South China, making it the first uncontroversial hurdiid from the Cambrian of China. This species is known only from a juvenile dorsal carapace, so it was not given a specific name.

Although originally suggested to have used its frontal appendages to sift sediment for prey, a later study by different authors suggested that it may have been a filter feeder instead.

References

Cambrian arthropods
Burgess Shale fossils
Fossil taxa described in 2019
Cambrian genus extinctions
Anomalocaridids